The Underwater Sounds (2009–2016) are a reggae/funk/fusion band based out of Philadelphia with soul, jazz, and psychedelic influences.  They began as Sonni Shine & the Underwater Sounds and released a self-titled EP in 2010.  They shortened the name after the 2012 release of their first full length entitled Que Se Queda.

The Underwater Sounds have performed over 600 east coast shows and several DIY tours, ranging from Maine to Asheville NC.  They've been a crossover addition to many PA and NJ jamband music festivals.  The band helped produce and throw the May Flora Music Festival series from 2010-2014.

Playing venues such as the TLA, the Blockley, the Ardmore Music Hall, the Paramount, and the Sherman Theater, the band opened or provided direct support for many of their favorite influences; Snarky Puppy, Groundation, John Brown's Body, Giant Panda Guerilla Dub Squad, The Skints, the Slackers, Pimps of Joytime, the English Beat, Easy Star All Stars, Ozric Tentacles, Consider the Source, and many more.

The Underwater Sounds released two EPs entitled Visions of Love & Light Parts 1 & 2.  There is also a live album entitled simply Live!.

In 2015, the band won the PHL Live Competition in the World Music Category, and was invited to City Hall to receive an award acknowledging their contribution to Philadelphia's music history.  They performed a final show on February 5, 2016 at Underground Arts before entering a 2 and a half year hiatus.

In 2018 the band emerged from hiatus and performed a handful of shows including Beardfest and Back to the Garden.  They are currently active and booking festival dates, as well as tending various side projects including Sonni Shine, PanSong, Miss Cantaloupe, Nik Greeley & the Operators, and Funk Norris.

Current members
Sonni Shine - Vocals, guitar
Billy Campion - Lead guitar
Ken Shumski - Bass
Sean Youngman - Drums

Past members
Dan Townsend - Keys
Erica Corbo - Rhodes
Kyle Press - Saxophone
Jake Hager - Keys
Ali Richardson - Keys

References

Reggae fusion groups
American reggae musical groups
Musical groups from Philadelphia